The Merida small-eared shrew (Cryptotis meridensis) is a species of shrew that is endemic to Venezuela.

Description
The fur is long, and chocolate brown over most of the body, fading to olive brown on the underside. Both the eyes and the ears are relatively small and are indistinct on external examination. The forepaws are large compared with other shrews, and have long claws. However, the species may be most easily distinguished from other small-eared shrews living in the same area by its upper canine teeth, which are unusually small, and are missing on one or both sides of the mouth in about 25% of individuals. Females have four teats, located on the inguinal region, while males have small, indistinct, scent glands on the flanks.

Distribution and habitat
Merida small-eared shrews are found only in mountainous regions of the Venezuelan states of Trujillo, Mérida, and Táchira. They inhabit cloud forests and sub-alpine páramo habitats between  elevation. It may also be found in areas of disturbed forest or secondary scrubland bordering its natural habitat, but is more commonly found where vegetation is dense and leaf-litter is thick.

There are no recognised subspecies.

Behaviour and biology
The Merida small-eared shrews feed primarily on invertebrates, such as earthworms, insects, spiders, centipedes and snails. They are relatively indiscriminate in the invertebrates they prey on, but about 70% of their diet consists of creatures found below the soil, rather than on the surface. They have also been reported to scavenge on dead vertebrates, and occasionally to feed on eggs or newborn rodents.

Although restricted to a relatively small geographic area, Merida small-eared shrews are common within their habitat, with population densities of up to  having been reported. Predators include barn owls, hawks, opossums, long-tailed weasels, and mountain coatis.

Reproduction apparently continues throughout the year, although it may be more common between March and April, and again between July and October. Litters range from two to four pups, with three being typical.

References

Mammals of Venezuela
Endemic fauna of Venezuela
Cryptotis
Páramo fauna
Taxonomy articles created by Polbot
Mammals described in 1898
Taxa named by Oldfield Thomas